Claude Prouvoyeur (5 January 1927 – 17 January 2018) was a French politician.

Born in 1927, Prouvoyeur was raised in Cateau. He moved to Dunkirk and began teaching at Lycée Jean-Bart in the late 1950s. While the mayor of Dunkirk, Prouvoyeur concurrently served in multiple  positions on the Nord regional council. He was elected to the Senate in 1983 as a representative for Nord, yielding the mayorship of Dunkirk to Michel Delebarre in 1989. Prouvoyeur left the Senate in 1992, and died at the age of 91 on 17 January 2018.

References

1927 births
2018 deaths
French Senators of the Fifth Republic
Mayors of places in Hauts-de-France
People from Dunkirk
People from Le Cateau-Cambrésis
Senators of Nord (French department)
National Centre of Independents and Peasants politicians